Charles Lee Glotzbach (June 19, 1938 – April 23, 2021) was an ARCA and NASCAR Winston Cup Series driver. He holds one of the oldest race records in NASCAR. He has the record for fastest pace at Bristol Motor Speedway for a NASCAR race. He was also known as the "Chargin' Comet" and "Chargin' Charlie".

Bristol race record
In 1971 Glotzbach won the caution-free Volunteer 500 at Bristol Motor Speedway in a record pace that still stands. The race was completed with an average speed of 101.074 mph (two hours, 38 minutes) at the .533-mile track. Glotzbach required relief during the middle of the race from Friday Hassler.

NASCAR history
Glotzbach's first NASCAR Winston Cup race was in 1960. While never running a full Winston Cup schedule, he ran a partial schedule every year from 1967 to 1975. The most he ran in a single year was in 1968, when he raced in 22 of 48 events. In 1969 he finished second in the Daytona 500 after being passed on the last lap by LeeRoy Yarbrough.

In late 1969, Glotzbach received broken ribs and was shot twice after firing an employee of his trucking company.  He returned the next season and continued to run competitively with one of the bullets still in his upper arm. (ABC Wide World of Sports Broadcast, 1970 Daytona 500.)

Glotzbach set a world record of 199.466 mph in September 1969 at Talladega, driving the Chrysler Engineering No. 88 Dodge Charger Daytona. The car was the pole winner, but Glotzbach, along with most other drivers, sat out the race due to a tire boycott.

His last NASCAR Winston Cup race was in 1992, a season when he competed in seven events. He has four wins and 12 poles in NASCAR and his last attempt was in 1994 for the inaugural Brickyard 400 when he did not qualify.

Other racing
Glotzbach was named the 1964 ARCA series Rookie of the Year. He also attempted to qualify for the 1969 and 1970 Indianapolis 500 races, but failed to qualify for both.

In later life, Glotzbach ran a truck sales business named "Charlie's Truck Sales" in Sellersburg, Indiana.

In a charity legends race on March 20, 2010, Glotzbach was involved in a serious crash at Bristol Motor Speedway.  He T-boned the driver's side of Larry Pearson at near full speed after Pearson spun.  Both drivers suffered injuries, but none were life-threatening.

Personal life
Glotzbach was born in Greenville, Indiana.                                                                                 
Charlie Glotzbach was found dead in his home in Jeffersonville, Indiana, on April 23, 2021. He was 82 years old.

Motorsports career results

NASCAR
(key) (Bold – Pole position awarded by qualifying time Italics – Pole position earned by points standings or practice time * – Most laps led)

Grand National Series

Winston Cup Series

Daytona 500

ARCA Hooters SuperCar Series
(key) (Bold – Pole position awarded by qualifying time. Italics – Pole position earned by points standings or practice time. * – Most laps led.)

References

External links

2001 Nascar.com article on his 1971 Bristol win

1938 births
2021 deaths
ARCA Menards Series drivers
NASCAR drivers
American Speed Association drivers
People from Floyd County, Indiana
Racing drivers from Indiana
People from Sellersburg, Indiana